Championship Soccer Stadium is a 2,500 seat soccer-specific stadium at the Orange County Great Park in Irvine, California. The stadium serves as the permanent home of Orange County SC of the second tier USL Championship league after the club began its existence relocating to various stadiums within the county. The newly founded California United Strikers FC of the third tier National Independent Soccer Association also moved into the venue in 2019, making it a shared stadium. Championship Soccer Stadium is publicly owned by the city of Irvine and is operated by the Great Park. The stadium features locker rooms, concession stands, a specialized fan experience area, and a box office. The facility has been credited with aiding and accelerating Orange County SC's youth development.

Between 2018 and 2019, Orange County FC of the National Premier Soccer League (no relation to the USL side) played some of their home matches at Championship Stadium.

In 2022, MLS Next Pro club LA Galaxy II (a reserve team for the LA Galaxy) entered discussions with the City of Irvine to use the stadium as its home venue beginning in the 2023 season. The leaked proposal included an exclusivity agreement that would have left Orange County SC without a home venue, causing protests from the club and other parties.

References

Irvine, California
Soccer venues in California
Sports venues in California
Sports venues in Irvine, California
Sports venues in Orange County, California
National Independent Soccer Association stadiums
USL Championship stadiums